Theodore Ndje (born November 11, 2001) is an American professional soccer player who plays as a midfielder.

Career 
Ndje grew up in Baltimore and played varsity soccer for Gilman School, scoring 14 goals in his 23-game freshman season. He played club soccer for Development Academy side Baltimore Armour, scoring 15 goals in 17 games during the 2016–17 season. Ndje was scouted by Argentine Primera División side Banfield and signed a two-year contract with the club's under-17 side in 2017.

In March 2020, Ndje returned to the US to sign a professional contract with USL League One side Orlando City B ahead of the 2020 season. On August 1, 2020, he made his debut in the season opener against Tormenta FC, appearing as a 77th minute substitute in the 2–0 defeat. He was released at the end of the season.

References

External links 
Theodore Ndje at Orlando City

2001 births
American soccer players
Association football midfielders
Living people
Orlando City B players
Soccer players from Baltimore
USL League One players